is a train station located in Chūō-ku. The station's symbol mark is a jar which is designed the arabesque scroll to look like the letter "". It has the station number "K05".

Lines

Platforms

Vicinity
Hawks Town (approx. 15 minutes by foot)
Fukuoka Yahoo! Japan Dome
Hilton Fukuoka Seahawk (ex-JAL Resort Seahawk Hotel Fukuoka)
Zepp Fukuoka
HKT48 Theater
National Hospital Organization Kyushu medical center (just across from Fukuoka Dome)
Tōjinmachi Shopping District
Heiwadai Hotel 5
several Elementary and High Schools
Nishi-nippon Junior College
United States Consulate
Republic of Korea Consulate General

References

Railway stations in Japan opened in 1981
Kūkō Line (Fukuoka City Subway)
Railway stations in Fukuoka Prefecture